IFK Kumla is a Swedish football club located in Kumla.

Background
IFK Kumla currently plays in Division 3 which is the fifth tier of Swedish football pyramid.

The club is affiliated to Örebro Läns Fotbollförbund.

Footnotes

External links
 IFK Kumla – Official website

Football clubs in Örebro County
Idrottsföreningen Kamraterna